Ringarum is a locality situated in Valdemarsvik Municipality, Östergötland County, Sweden with 577 inhabitants in 2010.

References 

Populated places in Östergötland County
Populated places in Valdemarsvik Municipality